During the night of 7 February 1813, two evenly matched frigates from the French Navy and the British Royal Navy, Aréthuse and , engaged in a battle in the Atlantic Ocean at the Îles de Los, off Guinea. The action lasted four hours, causing significant damage and casualties to both opponents, and resulted in a stalemate. The two ships parted and returned to their respective ports of call, with both sides claiming victory.

Background
After the British victory in the Mauritius campaign of 1809–1811, all French possessions in the Indian Ocean were controlled by the British. France had already lost the use of Cape Town in 1806 after the battles of Blaauwberg and Batavia in 1811, with the British Invasion of Java. Thus, in 1813, the French Navy lacked the advance bases it needed to support the commerce raiding frigate squadron that it had operated in the previous decade. It was therefore decided to send a force to the western coast of Africa to disrupt British shipping closer to the metropole, while still being far enough away to be beyond the reach of the powerful British naval divisions that blockaded the English Channel and the Bay of Biscay. To this end, a frigate division was given to Captain Pierre Bouvet, a skilled frigate commander, veteran of the Mauritius campaign and leader of the French forces during the second half of the Battle of Grand Port.

On 25 November 1812, Bouvet's division departed from Nantes, snuck through the British blockade, and established a station to the north-east of the Azores, near the group of five rocks called "Vigie des Cinq Grosses-Têtes" (44°17'N, 21°45'W). The frigates then continued to cruise off Madeira and Cape Verde. During January, due to continual gales and preliminary symptoms of a fever epidemic, Bouvet decided to sail south with two prizes, the British cutter Hawk, and the other the Portuguese slave ship Serra, to anchor at the Îles de Los, off Sierra Leone. On 27 January, the frigates and their prizes came in view of the islands when the 16-gun , under Lieutenant William Pascoe, appeared. Mistaking the French frigates for British cruisers, Daring launched a boat towards Rubis, which altered her course to intercept; as the frigate approached, the crew realised their error and attempted to flee, to no avail. Questioning his prisoners, Ollivier learnt the identity of his opponent, and gave chase. Hopelessly outmanned and outgunned, Pascoe threw his brig on the coast, on the north-western point of Tamara, and scuttled her by fire. Darings magazines detonated at 17:00, and the French frigates dropped anchor one hour later.

Ashore, the French collected fruit, resupplied their fresh water, and gathered intelligence on the British deployment: the station of Sierra Leone comprised two frigates and several corvettes, but only  was anchored in the bay at the time. After six days of repairs and resupply, Aréthuse and Rubis were ready for a six-month cruise; to unburden himself of his prisoners and prizes, Bouvet returned Serra to the Portuguese, and on 29 January, the British were released on parole and sent to Sierra Leone on Hawk. Bouvet departed on 4 February. Meanwhile, on 29 January, Lieutenant Pascoe had arrived at Freetown, with some of his men, and informed Amelia of the presence of what he believed to be three French frigates at Tamara. Hawk arrived the same evening with the prisoners on parole, confirming Pascoe's account; she was then equipped with a boat from Amelia and sent for a reconnaissance of the French squadron. Having volunteered, Pascoe returned with—this time—an accurate description of the French division, including the names of the frigates and their prize. On 3 February, at 10:30, Amelia departed her anchorage and took the direction of the Îles de Los to intercept the French squadron.

At the Îles de Los, Aréthuse had, upon departure, maneuvered to catch the wind and struck the bottom, breaking her rudder and forcing the squadron to drop anchor on the spot. That very night, a violent storm broke out, and both frigates broke their cables. Aréthuse managed to avoid running aground using a makeshift rudder, and in the morning found herself twelve miles to the north-west of Tamara; Bouvet dropped anchor as soon as he found the bottom to repair his rudder. Meanwhile, Rubis had been cast aground on the shore of Tamara. At ten, she fired distress shots and signals; Aréthuse launched her longboat to assist, but could not maneuver herself without her rudder; the launch carried two additional pumps to Rubis, but returned with the news that she was unsalvageable and that her crew was transferring on Serra. The following night, the hull of the stranded Rubis broke under the stress of the waves. Commander Ollivier scuttled her by fire and embarked his crew on Serra. On 5 January, around 20:00, Amelia sighted a strange sail making night signals which, the next morning, turned out to be Princess-Charlotte, a government schooner from Sierra Leone. Amelia got sight of the French squadron half an hour later, and dispatched Princess-Charlotte to Sierra Leone to instruct any incoming British warship to come to her aid at once. She then observed what was deemed to be a prize being unloaded into one of the frigates, but was in fact Rubis transferring her crew to Serra, and the second frigate in the distance.

Battle

In the morning of 6 February, while Aréthuse was completing her repairs,  appeared under the wind. Bouvet set sails to meet her and in the evening, the frigates sailed on parallel courses; As Irby was not aware of the demise of Rubis, he was attempting to lure Aréthuse away from her to prevent the two French frigates from supporting each other. Aréthuse having a slight advantage, and hoping to overhaul his opponent during the night, Bouvet hoisted the French colours and fired a carronade; Amelia answered by hoisting the Union Jack and firing a shot. At dawn, a fog obscured the frigates from each other, and Bouvet could not engage. The next morning, Aréthuse found herself alone on the sea, and Bouvet followed the course that he assumed Amelia had taken; around eleven, she appeared on the horizon and Aréthuse put on all sails to give chase. The frigates raced all day and at 19:30, Irby decided that he was far enough to avoid interference from Rubis, and Amelia turned to confront her opponent. Aréthuse was pierced for 44 guns, but actually mounted only 42: as her two foremost guns, obstructed by bollards, could not be maneuvered properly, Bouvet had ordered them stored in the hold. This left Aréthuse with twenty-six 18-pounder long guns, two 8-pounder chase guns, and fourteen 24-pounder carronades. Amelia mounted twenty-six 18-pounders and twenty 32-pounder carronades. Her crew was reinforced by that of Daring.

The frigates closed in to pistol range without opening fire. As they passed each other, Aréthuse came about and fired her broadside at Amelia that cut the braces of her topsail; Amelia answered in kind, and then veered and abruptly decreased her speed, her davit touching Aréthuse at starboard. Aréthuse fired another broadside at point-blank range, and for the following hour and a half, the two frigates remained entangled, exchanging volleys, gunners from both sides snatching the ramrods of their opponents and duelling with sabres from one gunport and the other, but neither side attempting to board the other. After 90 minutes of cannonade and gunfire, Captain Irby and his two lieutenants, John James Bates and John Pope, were wounded. The third lieutenant, George Wells, was killed soon after taking command, and the master of Amelia, Anthony De Mayne, replaced him. Then, Bouvet attempted a boarding to decide the issue, but with her clewlines cut by shots, Aréthuse could not maneuver. At 21:00, the frigates separated. The cannonade continued until 23:00, when the frigates lost contact. Soon, a dense fog hid the frigates one from another, and it was not until the next morning that Amelia was spotted again. According to Bouvet's report, Aréthuse attempted to give chase, but to no avail.

Aftermath

Each captain accused the other of having fled. Irby stated that Aréthuse "bore up, having the advantage of being able to do so, leaving us in an ungovernable state"; while Bouvet wrote "At eleven o'clock, firing ceased on both sides; we were no longer in range; and the enemy, putting on all sail, surrendered the battlefield to us". Another view is that the ships, their riggings both damaged, simply drifted away from each other under the effect of the cannonade. Aréthuse had 20 killed and 98 wounded. Amelia suffered 51 killed and 90 wounded.

Bouvet sailed to Tamara, where he rejoined Serra and the crew of Rubis on the 10th. Serra was taken in tow for a few days before Bouvet scuttled her by fire, off Madeira, as she retarded Aréthuse. Aréthuse returned to Saint-Malo with no further encounter, where she arrived on 19 April 1813. During their mission, Rubis and Aréthuse had captured ten prizes. Irby sailed to England, where he had been bound before the battle to repatriate sick sailors. He arrived at Spithead on 22 March, carrying large quantities of gold. Navy Minister Decrès gave a mixed review of the events. On one hand, he praised Bouvet's bravery and conduct during the battle itself; in his report of the events, on 26 April 1813, he wrote:

Louis-Philippe Crépin did paint a  depiction of the battle, which is in the collections of the Musée de Versailles.

On the other hand, Decrès sharply criticised Bouvet for the wreck of Rubis and near-loss of Aréthuse in the storm of 5 February:
 Probably because of these mixed reviews, Bouvet was awarded the rank of officer in the Legion of Honour, on 2 July, but was neither promoted to rear-admiral, nor made a Baron of the Empire, as had been requested in his favour.

Notes and references

Notes

References

Bibliography

James, William (1837) The Naval History of Great Britain, 1793–1820, Volume VI, R. Bentley, London.

Fonds Marine. Campagnes (opérations ; divisions et stations navales ; missions diverses). Inventaire de la sous-série Marine BB4. Tome deuxième : BB4 1 à 482 (1790–1826) 

1813 in France
Conflicts in 1813
Naval battles of the Napoleonic Wars
Wars involving Sierra Leone
February 1813 events
Naval battles involving France
Naval battles involving the United Kingdom